Mauro Perković (born 22 March 2003) is a Croatian professional football player who plays for Dinamo Zagreb on loan from Istra 1961.

Club career 
Mauro Perković made his professional debut for Istra 1961 on the 27 January 2021.

Personal Life 
Mauro is brother of professional basketball player Toni Perkovic who currently plays in PRO B league in France.

References

External links

2003 births
Living people
Croatian footballers
Croatia youth international footballers
Association football defenders
Sportspeople from Pula
NK Istra 1961 players
Croatian Football League players